The Grote Prijs Neerpelt is a cyclo-cross race held in Neerpelt, Belgium. In the 2010–2011 and 2011–2012 seasons, it was part of the Fidea Cyclocross Classics, a season long competition (without points) which ceased to exist after the 2011–2012 season. The GP Neerpelt is since the 2012–2013 season part of the SOUDAL Classics.

Winners

Men

Women

References

Cycle races in Belgium
Cyclo-cross races
Sport in Limburg (Belgium)